The 2011 Alabama Crimson Tide baseball team will represent the University of Alabama in the 2011 NCAA Division I baseball season.  The Crimson Tide play their home games in Sewell-Thomas Stadium.

Personnel

2011 Roster

2011 Alabama Crimson Tide Baseball Roster

Coaching Staff

Schedule/Results

! style="background:#FFF; color:#8B0000;"| Regular Season
|- valign="top" 

|- bgcolor="#ccffcc"
| 1 || February 18 || Alcorn State || Sewell-Thomas Stadium || 11–0 || A. Morgan (1–0)|| S. Easter (0–1)|| None|| 4,505 || 1–0 ||–
|- bgcolor="#ccffcc"
| 2 || February 19 || Alcorn State|| Sewell-Thomas Stadium || 5–1 || N. Kilcrease (1–0)|| T. Williams (0–1)|| B. Whitaker (1)|| 4,793 || 2–0||–
|- bgcolor="#ccffcc"
| 3 || February 20 || Alcorn State ||Sewell-Thomas Stadium  || 8–1 || T. Hawley (1–0)|| M. Sanchez (0–1)|| None|| 4,270 || 3–0 ||–
|- bgcolor="#ccffcc"
| 4 || February 22 || Alabama State || Sewell-Thomas Stadium || 11–7 || T. Wolfe (1–0)|| D. Quinney (0–1)|| None|| 3,888 || 4–0 ||–
|- bgcolor="#ffbbbb"
| 5 || February 25 ||SE Louisiana || Stanky Field || 2–6 || B. Efferson (2–0) || A. Morgan (1–1) || None|| – || 4–1 ||–
|- bgcolor="#ffbbbb"
| 6 || February 26 || South Alabama ||Stanky Field || 9–10|| W. Dees (3–0) ||J. Zylstra (0–1) || None ||– ||4–2 ||–
|- bgcolor="#ffbbbb"
| 7 || February 27 || UCF ||Stanky Field || 4–12 || B. Lively (1–0) || T. Hawley (1–1)|| None|| – ||4–3 ||–
|-

|- bgcolor="#ffbbbb"
| 8 || March 2 || Southern Miss || Sewell-Thomas Stadium || 6–10 || J. Rogers (1–0) || C. Sullivan (0–1)|| C. Cargill (3)|| 3,795||4–4 ||–
|- bgcolor="#ccffcc"
| 9 || March 4 ||Northwestern State ||Sewell-Thomas Stadium || 7–5|| B. Whitaker (1–0)|| L. Irvine (2–1) ||N. Kennedy (1) ||3,368 || 5–4||–
|- bgcolor="#ccffcc"
| 10 || March 5 ||Northwestern State||Sewell-Thomas Stadium ||4–2 || N. Kilcrease (2–0)|| C. Bear (2–1)||J. Smart (1) ||3,204 ||6–4 ||–
|- bgcolor="#ccffcc"
| 11 || March 6 ||Northwestern State || Sewell-Thomas Stadium || 9–0 || T. Hawley (2–1)|| M. Lackie (0–1)|| None|| 3,492 || 7–4 ||–
|- bgcolor="#ccffcc"
| 12 || March 8 ||Troy ||Sewell-Thomas Stadium || 6–511 || N. Kennedy (1–0)|| T. Workman (2–1)|| None|| 3,336 || 8–4 ||–
|- bgcolor="#ffbbbb"
| 13 || March 9†|| Georgia|| Coolray Field || 3–6 || E. Swegman (1–0) || T. Wolfe (1–1)|| B. Dieterich (1)|| 2,200||8–5 ||–
|- bgcolor="#ccffcc"
| 14 || March 11 ||Eastern Illinois ||Sewell-Thomas Stadium || 3–2 || J. Shaw (1–0)|| M. Miller (0–1)|| None|| 3,423 || 9–5 ||–
|- bgcolor="#ccffcc"
| 15 || March 12 ||Eastern Illinois ||Sewell-Thomas Stadium ||12–1 || A. Morgan (2–1)|| L. Bushur (0–2)||None ||3,523 ||10–5 ||–
|- bgcolor="#ccffcc"
| 16 || March 13 ||Eastern Illinois||Sewell-Thomas Stadium || 5–0 || T. Hawley (3–1)|| C. Slazinik (0–3)|| None|| 3,534 || 11–5 ||–
|- bgcolor="#ffbbbb"
| 17 || March 15† || Auburn ||Riverwalk Stadium || 1–2 || B. Hendrix (1–0) || T. Wolfe (1–2)|| Z. Blatt (1)|| 7,492 ||11–6 ||–
|- bgcolor="#ffbbbb"
| 18 || March 18 ||Ole Miss||Swayze Field  ||0–4 || M. Crouse (5–0) || N. Kilcrease (2–1)|| J. Morgan (5) ||8,665 ||11–7 ||0–1
|- bgcolor="#ccffcc"
| 19 || March 19 ||Ole Miss||Swayze Field ||7–5 || A. Morgan (3–1) ||D. Goforth (0–3) || J. Smart (2) ||9,405 ||12–7 ||1–1
|- bgcolor="#ccffcc"
| 20 || March 20 ||Ole Miss ||Swayze Field || 6–4 || T. Hawley (4–1)|| A. Wright (2–2)|| J. Smart (3)|| 8,544 || 13–7 ||2–1
|- bgcolor="#ccffcc"
| 21 || March 22 ||UAB  || Sewell-Thomas Stadium || 6–3 || C. Sullivan (1–1)|| B. Huddleston (1–2)|| J. Smart (4)|| 4,335 || 14–7 ||–
|- bgcolor="#ccffcc"
| 22 || March 23 ||Jacksonville State||Sewell-Thomas Stadium || 9–5 || T. Pilkington (1–0)|| T. Sparks (0–1)|| B. Whitaker (2)|| 3,431 || 15–7 ||–
|- bgcolor="#ccffcc"
| 23 || March 25 ||Kentucky||Sewell-Thomas Stadium || 4–0 || N. Kilcrease (3–1)|| A. Meyer (3–3)|| None|| 4,102 || 16–7 ||3–1
|- bgcolor="#ccffcc"
| 24 || March 26 ||  Kentucky || Sewell-Thomas Stadium||6–5 || J. Smart (1–0) ||T. Gott (1–2) || None ||3,575  ||17–7 ||4–1
|- bgcolor="#ccffcc"
| 25 || March 27 || Kentucky  ||Sewell-Thomas Stadium  || 8–3 || T. Hawley (5–1)|| T. Rogers (2–2)|| J. Smart (5)|| 3,526 || 18–7 ||5–1
|- bgcolor="#ffbbbb"
| 26 || March 29 ||UAB   ||Regions Park || 1–5 || M. McKinley (2–0)|| T. Pilkington (1–1)|| None|| 903 || 18–8 ||–
|- bgcolor="#ccffcc"
| 27 || March 30 ||South Alabama ||Sewell-Thomas Stadium || 4–3 || A. Windsor (1–0)||J. Miller (0–3)|| None|| 2,962 || 19–8 ||–
|-

|- bgcolor="#ccffcc"
| 28 || April 1 ||Arkansas ||Sewell-Thomas Stadium ||5–3 || N. Kilcrease (4–1)|| C. Lynch (2–1)|| J. Smart (6)|| 3,977 || 20–8 ||6–1
|- bgcolor="#ccffcc"
| 29 || April 2 ||Arkansas||Sewell-Thomas Stadium ||5–3 || A. Morgan (4–1) ||D. Baxendale  (5–1) || J. Smart (7) ||4,877 ||21–8 ||7–1
|- bgcolor="#ffbbbb"
| 30 || April 3 ||Arkansas|| Sewell-Thomas Stadium ||3–4 || T. Daniel (1–0) ||T. Hawley (5–2) || N. Sanburn (3) ||4,051 ||21–9 ||7–2
|- bgcolor="#ffbbbb"
| 31 || April 5 || Samford ||Sewell-Thomas Stadium ||2–4 || C. Irby (3–1) ||C. Nixon (0–1) || A. Jones (8) ||3,780||21–10 ||–
|- bgcolor="#ffbbbb"
| 32 || April 8 ||#1 Vanderbilt||Hawkins Field ||3–11|| S. Gray (7–1) ||N. Kilcrease (4–2) || None ||3,118 ||21–11 ||7–3
|- bgcolor="#ffbbbb"
| 33 || April 9 ||#1 Vanderbilt||Hawkins Field  ||0–7 || G. Garvin (6–1) ||A. Morgan (4–2) ||None ||3,141 ||21–12 ||7–4
|- bgcolor="#ffbbbb"
| 34 || April 10 ||#1 Vanderbilt ||Hawkins Field ||6–11 || C. Williams (1–0) ||T. Pilkington (1–2) || None ||3,357 ||21–13 ||7–5
|- bgcolor="#ccffcc"
| 35 || April 12 || MS Valley St ||Sewell-Thomas Stadium ||10–1 || C. Sullivan (2–1) ||M. Kaplan  (0–1) || None ||3,347 ||22–13 ||–
|- bgcolor="#ccffcc"
| 36 || April 13 || MS Valley St ||Sewell-Thomas Stadium  ||10–0 || A. Windsor (2–0) ||S. Barnes  (4–4) || None ||3,261 ||23–13 ||–
|- bgcolor="#ccffcc"
| 37 || April 14 ||Tennessee||Sewell-Thomas Stadium  ||8–2 || N. Kilcrease (5–2)|| R. Catapano (2–3)|| None|| 4,012 || 24–13 ||8–5
|- bgcolor="#ffbbbb"
| 38 || April 16 ||Tennessee ||Sewell-Thomas Stadium ||1–27 || S. Gruver (4–4)|| A. Morgan (4–3)|| None|| –|| 24–14 ||8–6
|- bgcolor="#ffbbbb"
| 39 || April 16 ||Tennessee ||Sewell-Thomas Stadium ||0–17 || N. Blount (1–0)|| T. Pilkington (1–3)|| N. Williams (2)|| 5,483 || 24–15 ||8–7
|- bgcolor="#ccffcc"
| 40 || April 19 || Samford ||Joe Lee Griffin Stadium||7–5 || J. Smart (2–0)|| A. Jones (0–3)|| None|| 1,847 || 25–15 ||–
|- bgcolor="#ffbbbb"
| 41 || April 22 ||#5 Florida ||McKethan Stadium||0–7 || H. Randall (7–1)|| N. Kilcrease (5–3)|| None|| 4,206 || 25–16 ||8–8
|- bgcolor="#ffbbbb"
| 42 || April 23 ||#5 Florida  ||McKethan Stadium||2–9 || B. Johnson (6–1)|| A. Morgan (4–4)|| None|| 4,917|| 25–17 ||8–9
|- bgcolor="#ffbbbb"
| 43 || April 24 ||#5 Florida  ||McKethan Stadium||1–2 || K. Whitson (5–0)|| J. Smart (2–1)|| N. Maronde (2)|| 2,759 || 25–18 ||8–10
|- bgcolor="#ccffcc"
| 44 || April 26 || Southern Miss ||Pete Taylor Park ||7–3 || A. Windsor (3–0) ||D. Day  (1–1) || T. Wolfe (1) ||4,374 ||26–18 ||–
|- bgcolor="#ccffcc"
| 45 || April 30 ||Mississippi State ||Dudy Noble Field ||5–410 || J. Smart (3–1) ||C. Reed (0–1) || None ||– ||27–18 ||9–10
|- bgcolor="#ccffcc"
| 46 || April 30 ||Mississippi State ||Dudy Noble Field||5–4 || T. Pilkington (2–3) ||L. Pollorena (5–3) || J. Smart (8) ||6,500 ||28–18 ||10–10
|-

|- bgcolor="#ffbbbb"
| 47 || May 1 ||Mississippi State||Dudy Noble Field ||5–8 || E. Mitchell (4–1)|| A. Windsor (3–1)|| C. Reed (8)|| 5,877 || 28–19 ||10–11
|- bgcolor="#ffbbbb"
| 48 || May 6 ||LSU ||Sewell-Thomas Stadium ||6–10 || K. McCune (6–3)|| N. Kilcrease (5–4)|| None|| 4,175 || 28–20 ||10–12
|- bgcolor="#ccffcc"
| 49 || May 7 ||LSU || Sewell-Thomas Stadium ||4–0 || A. Morgan (5–4) ||K. Gausman  (3–6) || J. Smart (9) ||4,185 ||29–20 ||11–12
|- bgcolor="#ccffcc"
| 50 || May 8 || LSU || Sewell-Thomas Stadium ||9–0 || J. Smart (4–1) ||B. Alsup (6–5) || None ||4,019 ||30–20||12–12
|- bgcolor="#ffbbbb"
| 51 || May 14 || Auburn ||Plainsman Park ||5–7 || D. Ortman (2–1)|| A. Windsor (3–2)|| None|| 3,316 || 30–21 ||12–13
|- bgcolor="#ffbbbb"
| 52 || May 14 || Auburn ||Plainsman Park||7–8 || E. Wallen (5–5)|| C. Sullivan (2–2)|| D. Ortman (4)|| 3,316 || 30–22 ||12–14
|- bgcolor="#ccffcc"
| 53 || May 15 ||Auburn ||Plainsman Park ||7–6 ||T. Hawley (6–2) ||S. Smith (2–1) || None ||3,422 ||31–22||13–14
|- bgcolor="#ccffcc"
| 54 || May 19 || South Carolina ||Sewell-Thomas Stadium  ||2–1 ||N. Kilcrease (6–4) ||M. Roth (10–3) || None ||3,523 ||32–22||14–14
|- bgcolor="#ffbbbb"
| 55 || May 20 || South Carolina||Sewell-Thomas Stadium ||3–6 || F. Koumas (6–0)|| A. Morgan (5–5)|| M. Price (14)|| 3,945 || 32–23 ||14–15
|- bgcolor="#ffbbbb"
| 56 || May 21 ||South Carolina||Sewell-Thomas Stadium ||2–3 || C. Holmes (6–2)|| J. Smart (4–2)|| M. Price (14)|| 3,764 || 32–24 ||14–16
|-

|-
! style="background:#FFF;color:#8B0000;"| Post-Season
|-

|- bgcolor="#ccffcc"
| 57 || May 25 ||#20 Arkansas  ||Regions Park ||7–4 ||N. Kilcrease (7–4) ||R. Fant (3–4) || J. Smart (10) || 8,392 ||33–24||1–0
|- bgcolor="#ffbbbb"
| 58 || May 26 ||#3 Florida ||Regions Park ||0–6 ||H. Randall (9–3) || A. Morgan (5–6)|| None|| 7,123 || 33–25 ||1–1
|- bgcolor="#ffbbbb"
| 59 || May 27 ||#20 Arkansas  ||Regions Park ||1–4 ||R. Stanek (3–2) || J. Smart (4–3)|| T. Daniel (3)|| 8,068 || 33–26 ||1–2
|-

|- bgcolor="#ccffcc"
| 60 || June 3 ||UCF  ||Dick Howser Stadium ||5–3 ||N. Kilcrease (8–4) ||B. Adkins (6–5) || J. Smart (11) ||2,832 ||34–26||1–0
|- bgcolor="#ffbbbb"
| 61 || June 4 ||#6 Florida State||Dick Howser Stadium ||5–9 ||S. Gilmartin (12–1) || A. Morgan (5–7)|| None|| 4,008 || 34–27 ||1–1
|- bgcolor="#ccffcc"
| 60 || June 3 ||UCF ||Dick Howser Stadium ||12–5 ||J. Smart (5–3) ||N. Cicio  (4–3) || None ||2,631 ||35–27||2–1
|- bgcolor="#ffbbbb"
| 61 || June 4 ||#6 Florida State||Dick Howser Stadium ||1–11 ||M. McGee (4–3) || A. Windsor (3–3)|| None|| 3,521 || 35–28 ||2–2
|-

| † Indicates the game does not count toward the 2011 Southeastern Conference standings.*Rankings are based on the team's current  ranking in the Baseball America poll the week Alabama faced each opponent.

Rankings

Awards and honors
Taylor Dugas
 2011 NCBWA Preseason All-American, Third Team
Josh Rosecrans
 SEC Player of the Week, March 28, 2011
Nathan Kilcrease
 SEC Pitcher of the Week, May 23, 2011

See also
 Alabama Crimson Tide baseball
 2011 NCAA Division I baseball season
 2011 Alabama Crimson Tide softball season

Alabama Crimson Tide in the 2011 MLB Draft
The following members of the Alabama Crimson Tide baseball program were drafted in the 2011 MLB Draft.

References

Alabama Crimson Tide Baseball Team, 2011
Alabama Crimson Tide baseball seasons
Alabama Crimson Tide baseball team
Alabama